is a Japanese basketball player. He competed in the men's tournament at the 1964 Summer Olympics.

References

1941 births
Living people
Japanese men's basketball players
Olympic basketball players of Japan
Basketball players at the 1964 Summer Olympics
Place of birth missing (living people)